SPRY domain-containing protein 7 (SPRYD7) also known as chronic lymphocytic leukemia deletion region gene 6 protein (CLLD6) is a protein that in humans is encoded by the SPRYD7 gene.

References

Further reading